The Steghorn is a mountain of the Bernese Alps, located on the border between the Swiss cantons of Bern and Valais. It lies between the Engstligenalp (Bernese Oberland and the Gemmi Pass (Valais). The Steghorn belongs to the massif of the Wildstrubel.

The easiest ascent can be made from the "Lämmeren" hut in the canton of Valais via the Steghorn glacier or the Leiterli rocks. Another route leads from Engstligenalp along the ridge between Steghorn and Wildstrubel.

The mountain can also be ascended from both sides during wintertime, yet the skiing tour is very challenging.

References

External links

Steghorn on Hikr

Mountains of the Alps
Alpine three-thousanders
Mountains of Switzerland
Mountains of Valais
Mountains of the canton of Bern
Bern–Valais border